The following Confederate units and commanders fought in the Second Battle of Fort Fisher (January 13–15, 1865) of the American Civil War. The Union order of battle is listed separately. Order of battle compiled from the army organization during the expedition.

Abbreviations used

Military rank
 MG = Major General
 BG = Brigadier General
 Col = Colonel
 Ltc = Lieutenant Colonel
 Maj = Major
 Cpt = Captain
 Lt = 1st Lieutenant
 Bvt = Brevet

Confederate Forces

District of North Carolina
Gen. Braxton Bragg

Notes

See also

 North Carolina in the American Civil War

References
 
 Moore, Mark A. The Wilmington Campaign and the Battles for Fort Fisher. Da Capo Press, 1999.
 U.S. War Department, The War of the Rebellion: a Compilation of the Official Records of the Union and Confederate Armies. Washington, DC: U.S. Government Printing Office, 1880–1901.

External links
North Carolina Historical Sites: Fort Fisher - ORGANIZATION OF CONFEDERATE FORCES

American Civil War orders of battle